The Salmon River Trail is a  Blue-Blazed hiking trail in Colchester, and East Hampton, Connecticut and is almost entirely in the Salmon River State Forest and Day Pond State Park.   Almost all of the trail is in Colchester, the parking lot and part of the Comstock Covered Bridge over the Salmon River are in East Hampton.

Trail description

The Salmon River Trail is primarily used for hiking, backpacking, picnicking, and in the winter, snowshoeing.

Portions of the trail are suitable for, and are used for, cross-country skiing and geocaching. Site-specific activities enjoyed along the route include bird watching, hunting (very limited), fishing, horseback riding,  bouldering and rock climbing (limited).

Trail route

Trail communities

The official Blue-Blazed Salmon River Trail passes through land located within the following municipalities, from south to north:
Colchester and East Hampton, Connecticut.

Landscape, geology, and natural environment

History and folklore

The Blue-Blazed Salmon River Trail was created by the Connecticut Forest and Park Association.

Historic sites

Hiking the trail

The mainline trail is blazed with blue rectangles. Trail descriptions are available from a number of commercial and non-commercial sources, and a complete guidebook is published by the Connecticut Forest and Park Association

Weather along the route is typical of Connecticut. Conditions on exposed ridge tops and summits may be harsher during cold or stormy weather. Lightning is a hazard on exposed summits and ledges during thunderstorms. Snow is common in the winter and may necessitate the use of snowshoes. Ice can form on exposed ledges and summits, making hiking dangerous without special equipment.

Biting insects can be bothersome during warm weather. Parasitic deer ticks (which are known to carry Lyme disease) are a potential hazard.

Wearing bright orange clothing during the hunting season (Fall through December) is recommended.

Conservation and maintenance of the trail corridor

See also
 Blue-Blazed Trails
 Colchester
 East Hampton
 Salmon River State Forest

References

Further reading

External links
Specific to this trail:
 CT Museum Quest Article on the Salmon River Trail 

Government links:
 State of Connecticut - Salmon River State Forest web page
 State of Connecticut - Salmon River State Forest map
 Seedling Letterbox Series Clues for Salmon River State Forest
 State of Connecticut - Day Pond State Park web page
 State of Connecticut - Day Pond State Park map

 

Blue-Blazed Trails
Protected areas of Middlesex County, Connecticut
Colchester, Connecticut
East Hampton, Connecticut
Protected areas of New London County, Connecticut